Dzoavits was a demon or ogre from Shoshonean mythology who stole the sun and kidnapped children. He is associated with volcanism and cannibalism. In most legends he confronts several mythological animals before being trapped in a cave, the most common one being Devils Hole.

References

External links
Rose, Carol. (2001) Giants, monsters, and dragons: an encyclopedia of folklore, legend, and myth.
Godchecker entry

Native American demons
Shoshone
Legendary creatures of the indigenous peoples of North America